Earthquakes in Guam are infrequent but are often accompanied by tsunami. The small island, which is an unincorporated and organized territory of the United States, lies at the extreme southern end of the Mariana Islands and at the eastern margin of the Philippine Sea Plate.

See also
Geology of Guam

References

Sources

Further reading
Lander, James & Whiteside, Lowell & Paul, Hattori. (2002). The tsunami history of Guam: 1849–1993. Science of Tsunami Hazards. 20. 

Earthquakes in Guam
Guam
Earthquakes
Tsunamis in Guam